Samar (Old Samara) is a city neighborhood of the Samarskyi District (urban district) of the Dnipro Municipality in southern Ukraine. It is located at the mouth of Samara River on its right bank where the river enters Dnieper.

History
The exact year of foundation of the city is still researched. Archeologic founds suggest that the town existed in 1524. In 2011 The Ukrainian Week stated that archaeologists of the Dnipro National University discovered artifacts dated around 1520s.

The earliest mentioning of Samar as a settlement in Lower Dnieper region is a royal edict of the King of Poland Stephen Báthory in 1576. It was a river port administrated by local Cossacks.

It is the only large settlement of the Zaporozhian Cossacks on Ukraine's steppes which survived without significant destruction.<ref name="8017944DniproNovobohorodytska"> "Dnipro is a city of three fortresses", not "a city of scoops". Radio Free Europe (28 September 2016)</ref> The remains the fortress occupy an area of almost 70 hectares. According to scientists, the fortress did not appear out of nowhere: more than 1,700 years ago there was a settlement of an ancient tribe. In 2001, by a resolution of the Government of Ukraine, the remains of the Novobohorodytska fortress was declared a historical monument of national importance.

References

External links
 Iryna Shovkovets. Cossacks' city on Samara (Козацьке місто на Самарі)''. Ukrayina Moloda. 31 October 2008. 
 The city of Dnipro is 250 years older and it was considered, historians (Місто Дніпро на 250 років старіше, ніж вважалось - історики). UNIAN. 1 June 2017 

Neighborhoods of Dnipro
Yekaterinoslav Governorate